Every Moment is the first studio album from Curt Anderson. Dream Records released the album on January 15, 2016.

Critical reception

Awarding the album four stars from CCM Magazine, Andy Argyrakis describes, "vibrant canvas." Joshua Andre, allotting the album a four star review at 365 Days of Inspiring Media, states, "a memorable debut album". Sarah Berdon, allocating the album a two and a half star rating for Jesus Freak Hideout, writes, "Mediocrity". Giving the album a three star review from Jesus Freak Hideout, Christopher Smith says, "Every Moment is worth checking out".

Track listing

References

2016 debut albums